Our Circle Is Vicious is the third studio album by the Belgian hardcore punk band Rise and Fall. The album was released on October 27, 2009 through Deathwish Inc. The album artwork was designed by Jacob Bannon of the hardcore group Converge.

Track listing
 "Soul Slayer" – 1:11
 "Built on Graves" – 2:44
 "Harm's Way" – 2:53
 "It's a Long Way Down" – 2:04
 "To the Bottom" – 5:03
 "In Circles" – 4:21
 "Het Oog Van De Storm" – 1:58
 "Stillborn" – 1:55
 "A Present Tense" – 2:02
 "Knowing" – 5:04

References

2009 albums
Rise and Fall (band) albums
Deathwish Inc. albums
Albums produced by Kurt Ballou
Albums with cover art by Jacob Bannon